Narva Kirik is a newspaper published in Narva, Estonia.

References

Newspapers published in Estonia
Mass media in Narva